Fariborz Lachini (born August 25, 1949) is an Iranian film score composer.

Career
He started his career in Iran writing music for children, creating "Avaz Faslha va Rangha" at the age of 18 which caught the attention of the royal family of the time. The title of national Iranian TV's children programming for more than two decades was one of his earlier works. Before Iran's Islamic Revolution, he also created music for some of Iran's pop icons.

After the Islamic Revolution he moved to Europe to study Musicology in the Universite de Paris – Sorbonne. It was then that his music became influenced by European styles. He returned home and created one of the best-loved contemporary solo piano albums of all in Iran with a unique style, a combination of Persian and European Romantic styles called "Paeez Talaee", also known as Golden Autumn, which has been the number-one seller for years in Iran and has attracted fans from all around the world.

He started composing for motion pictures using the skills and techniques acquired in Europe and soon earned himself recognition as a pioneer of computer technology in music in Cinema of Iran. Since 1988, he has scored for more than a hundred feature films, some of which have been showcased internationally in North America, Europe, and Asia.

Discography 
 1976: Avaz Faslha Va Rangha
 1977: Avazhaye Digar
 1978: Afsoon
 1989: Childish
 1990: Pomegranate and Cane
 1990: Snake Fang
 1989: Golden Autumn 1
 1991: In a Cold Winter Night
 1991: Golden Autumn 2
 1992: Wolf's Trail Soundtrack
 1978: Flying
 1994: Songs of the Sun Land
 1998: The Tribe of Love
 2000: For Your Birthday
 2000: Waves of Memories 1
 2001: Pandemonium of Fire and Water
 2002: A Letter
 2003: Waves of Memories 2
 2005: Last Word of Nowadays
 2005: Sepidar
 2006: Best Soundtracks of Fariborz Lachini - Vol.1
 2006: Golden Autumn 3
 2008: Scent of Yesterday 1
 2008: Scent of Yesterday 2
 2008: Aida - Film Score
 2008: Golden Autumn 4
 2008: Requiem 1
 2008: Golden Memories 1
 2008: Scent of Yesterday 3
 2009: Scent of Yesterday 4
 2009: Scent of Yesterday 5
 2009: Salam - Film Score
 2009: Piano Adagios
 2009: Christmas Piano
 2010: Requiem 2
 2010: Gol Afshan 1
 2010: Gol Afshan 2
 2010: Diar 1
 2010: Scent of Yesterday 6
 2010: Diar 2
 2010: Golden Memories 2
 2010: Scent of Yesterday 7
 2010: La Chambre Noire - Film Score
 2010: Diar 3
 2010: Scent of Yesterday 8
 2010: Scent of Yesterday 9
 2011: Scent of Yesterday 10
 2011: Scent of Yesterday 11
 2011: Requiem 3

Filmography (as composer)
 1978: Baba Khaldar (Iran)
 1979: Maryam and Mani (Iran)
 1989: Pomegranate and Cane (Nar-o-Ney) (Iran)
 1990: Sun's Blade (Iran)
 1990: The Singing Cat (Iran)
 1990: Snake Fang (Iran)
 1991: Life's Luck (Iran)
 1992: The Man in the Mirror (Iran)
 1993: Once and For All (Iran)
 1994: The Wolf's Trail (Iran)
 1994: Jewel Mountain (Iran)
 1994: Bluff (Iran)
 1994: Lost Paradise (Iran)
 1995: Utterly Cold Blooded (Iran)
 1995: Trap (Iran)
 1995: Born Loser (Iran)
 1996: Javanmard (Iran)
 1996: Unforgiven (Iran)
 1997: Wounded (Iran)
 1997: Claws in Dust (Iran)
 1998: Tootia (Iran)
 1998: Stranger (Iran)
 1999: Youth (Iran)
 2000: Friends (Iran)
 2002: Disturbant (Iran)
 2003: Poison of Honey (Iran)
 2003: Donya (Iran)
 2003: Black Eyes (Iran)
 2003: Boutique (Iran)
 2004: Non Stop to Tokyo (Iran)
 2004: Salam (Iran/Afghanestan)
 2005: Top of Tower (Iran)
 2005: Redemption at 8:20 (Iran)
 2005: Aida, I Saw Your Father Last Night (Iran/USA)
 2005: Requiem of Snow (Iran/Iraq)
 2005: 365 Boots on Ground (USA)
 2006: Wedding Dinner (Iran)
 2007: My Pink Shirt (Canada)

References

External links 
 Fariborz Lachini Official Site
 

Iranian composers
Iranian film score composers
1949 births
Living people
Composers for piano
Iranian music arrangers